The Semi-Conductor Laboratory, Mohali (SCL) formerly knows as Semiconductor Complex Limited(1982-2005) is a research institute under Ministry of Electronics and Information Technology (MeitY), Government of India (formerly under Department Of Space). Its aims include research and development in the field of semiconductor technology.

SCL had its origin as the Semiconductor Complex Limited , a public sector undertaking of the Government of India.In 1983 it commenced production of 5 micron CMOS [complimentary metal-oxide semiconductor] technology.SCL runs a Class 10, 6-inch wafer facility with an annual capacity of 20,000 wafers based on 1.2-micron CMOS technology. Now in the process of moving to 0.8-micron technology, the facility is upgradable to 0.6-micron production and 100,000 wafer-processing capacity per year. SCL's revenues in 1999-2000 were about $14 million, with a profit of roughly $400,000. It came under the administrative control of the Department of Space in March 2005 and has since undergone organisational restructuring to become focused on research and development. The society was registered in November 2005.

Main objective of SCL is to undertake, aid, promote, guide and coordinate the R&D in the field of semiconductor technology, Micro-Electro-Mechanical Systems (MEMS) and process technologies relating to semiconductor processing in the existing 6" wafer fab. SCL has over the years developed and supplied a number of key VLSIs, majority of which have been Application Specific Integrated Circuits (ASICs) for high reliability applications in industrial and space sectors. Steps have been initiated to upgrade the facilities to fabricate devices in 0.25 micron or better technology.

The Semi-Conductor Laboratory is responsible for design and development of very-large-scale integration (VLSI) devices and development of systems for the telecommunication and space sectors. SCL has facilities for fabrication of micro-electronic devices in 0.8 micrometre range and Micro Electro Mechanical Systems. Facilities to fabricate advanced devices in 0.35 micrometre range are planned.

SCL, through its in-house R&D efforts  has developed 3 micron, 2 micron, 1.2 micron and 0.8 micron CMOS technologies as well specialized technologies such as EEPROM and CCD. SCL has over the years developed and supplied a number of key VLSIs, majority of which have been ASICs for high reliability and industrial applications.

IIT Madras uses SCL as a primary foundry to tapeout SHAKTI processors using its 180 nm technology process.

Fab upgrade
The Department of Space (DoS) planned to upgrade SCL to produce chips of 0.18 micrometre (180 nanometre) size from the old 0.8 micrometres. Starting in 2010, SCL has upgraded to 8" wafer fab to produce chips of 0.18 micrometer (180 nanometre) CMOS process as made available by Tower Semiconductor, Israel.

Modernization Efforts

As part of governments $10 billion incentive package to build a semiconductor ecosystem in the country, the government is likely to pursue its efforts to modernize and commercialize the brownfield semiconductor chip fabrication facility of SCL through a joint venture.SCL Mohali has also been handed over to MeitY from Department of Space and it is being opened up as a commercial fab for wider participation by Indian semiconductor design companies. This is expected to strengthen India’s quest for AtmaNirbhar Bharat in semiconductors.

References
{{reflist||

Space programme of India
Microtechnology
2005 establishments in Punjab, India
Research institutes established in 2005
Research institutes in Punjab, India
Mohali